Harkers Canyon is located  southeast of the town of Tooele, in Tooele County, Utah, USA. Located high in the Oquirrh Mountains, the canyon is oriented north-south, and drains into Middle Canyon at its northern end. The top of the canyon at its southern end is at approximately 2900 m (9500 ft) elevation. The mouth of Harkers Canyon is at 1975 m (6480 ft) elevation. Harkers Canyon is in the Rush Valley watershed.

References

Canyons and gorges of Utah
Landforms of Tooele County, Utah